Acrocercops anthracuris is a moth of the family Gracillariidae, known from Maharashtra, India. The host plant for the species is Pongamia pinnata.

References

anthracuris
Moths of Asia
Moths described in 1926